Joseph Franz Weigl (19 May 1740 - 25 January 1820) was a Bavarian and Austrian cellist. He was a cellist in the orchestra of the Esterházy family. He played under the directorship of Joseph Haydn, who also was godfather to the cellist's son,  and it is thought that Haydn wrote his cello concerto in C major (Hob. VIIb/1) for him.

He was the father of Joseph Weigl (1766 - 1846), the composer and conductor.

Austrian classical cellists
People from Eisenstadt
1740 births
1820 deaths